Discovery Holding Company was an American company headquartered in Meridian, Colorado. The postal designation of nearby Englewood was commonly listed as the company's location in corporate filings and news accounts.

The company used to hold a 66-2/3% ownership stake in Discovery Communications, LLC, and operated Ascent Media and AccentHealth, LLC.  On September 17, 2008, Discovery Holdings divested its interest in Ascent Media, and reorganized its remaining businesses around a new publicly traded holding company, Discovery Communications, Inc.

Corporate governance
Members of the board of directors of Discovery Holding included: John C. Malone and Robert R. Bennett. Former CEO John C. Malone is also the chairman of Liberty Media Corporation from which Discovery Holding Company was spun off in 2005.

Financials
Source: SEC filings
 Cash and cash equivalents at March 31, 2007: $150M USD 
 Total shareholders’ equity at March 31, 2007: $4,570M USD 
 Revenue for 2006: $688M USD 
 Net earnings for 2006: -$28M USD

Holdings
Discovery Holding owned the following subsidiary companies until the corporate restructuring completed on September 17, 2008.

 Ascent Media
66-2/3% of Discovery Communications, LLC.

Spin-off and restructuring
On December 13, 2007, Discovery Holdings announced a restructuring plan.  The company planned to spin off its interest in Ascent Media, and combine Discovery Communications with Advance/Newhouse Communications into a new holding company .  The reorganization was completed on September 17, 2008.

References

External links
 - Form 8-K for Discovery Communications, Inc.: Completion of Acquisition or Disposition of Assets, Changes in Reg
 - SEC Information statement on Discovery Holding Company, Inc.
Yahoo! - Discovery Holding Inc. Company Profile

Discovery, Inc.
Predecessors of Warner Bros. Discovery
Companies based in Meridian, Colorado
Companies based in Colorado
2005 establishments in Colorado
2008 disestablishments in Colorado